The 2008 congressional elections in Hawaii were held on November 4, 2008 to determine who was to represent the state of Hawaii in the United States House of Representatives for the 111th Congress from January 3, 2009, until their terms of office expire on January 3, 2011. Incumbent Neil Abercrombie (D) was reelected in Hawaii's 1st congressional district. Incumbent Mazie Hirono (D) was reelected in Hawaii's 2nd congressional district.

Hawaii has two seats in the House, apportioned according to the 2000 United States Census. Representatives are elected for two-year terms. The election coincided with the 2008 U.S. presidential election.

Overview

District 1

This district has been represented by Democrat Neil Abercrombie since 1991. He ran against Republican Steve Tataii and Libertarian Li Zhao. CQ Politics forecasted the race as "Safe Democrat".

District 2

This district has been represented by Democrat Mazie Hirono since 2007.  She ran against Republican Roger B. Evans, Independent Shaun Stenshol, and Libertarian Jeff Mallan. CQ Politics forecasted the race as "Safe Democrat".

References

External links
Hawaii Office of Elections
U.S. Congress candidates for Hawaii at Project Vote Smart
Hawaii U.S. House Races from 2008 Race Tracker
Campaign contributions for Hawaii congressional races from OpenSecrets

2008
Hawaii
United States House of Representatives